Al Ras, Ar Rass, or variants thereof, may refer to:
 Ar Rass, a city in central Saudi Arabia
 Al Rass, Bareq, a neighborhood in southwestern Saudi Arabia
 Al Ras, Dubai, a locality in Dubai, UAE
 Al Ras (Dubai Metro), a station
 Al-Ras, Tulkarm, a Palestinian village in the West Bank
 Al-Ras al-Ahmar, a former Palestinian village near Safad
 Ras Karkar, also known as Er-Ras, a Palestinian village near Ramallah
 Aras (river), known in Arabic as al-Rass, a river in the Caucasus
 People of Ar-Rass, a legendary community mentioned in the Qur'an
 Al-ras (drum), a drum used in Qatar and the UAE